Grobari (Serbian Cyrillic: Гробари, English: Gravediggers) are the organized supporters group of the Serbian football club Partizan Belgrade. They are one of two major football fan groups in Serbia. They generally support all clubs within the Partizan multi-sports club, and mostly wear black and white symbols, which are the club's colors. 

The group as a whole traditionally maintains good relations with the Greek PAOK football club supporters Gate 4 as well as with the fans of Russian club PFC CSKA Moscow.

History 

First groups of organized Partizan fan supporters began to visit the JNA stadium in the late 1950s. Those were mainly young men from Belgrade, and they occupied southern stands of the stadium. In those times, support was expressed by loud singing as well as polling of referees and opposite team's players.

Partizan's participation in the European Cup final in 1966 attracted much more fans to the stadium, and is considered to be the crucial moment of the organized fans moving to a south stand of the stadium where they are gathering up to this day. Steady group by the Grobari name was formed in 1970. and during the following decade, as well as all over Europe, Grobari started bringing fan equipment to the stadiums such as flares, supporting scarfs, banners and flags (in the late 1970s), which gave a whole new aspect to the sport club supporting.

By the 1980s, Grobari were one of the largest and most organized fan groups in SFR Yugoslavia and began out-marching to all of Partizan's matches across the country and Europe. Because of their expressed hooliganism toward other club's supporters in those times, fans who represented the core of the Grobari firm were often referred to as a "punishment expedition". In 1987, Grobari in Toronto formed a group under the name of Gravediggers Canada 1987.

1999 Split

In 1999, there was a big split when the newly formed fan group named Južni Front (Southern Front) accused several top members of the Grobari 1970 organization for abusing their privileges, and the club itself for favorising those individuals. Grobari 1970 were actually accused of manipulating with the money given by the club for organizing fan support. Several hundred members of Južni Front left the traditional south stand and occupied the north stand of the stadium. The split lasted for a few years until 2005, when the fans settled their differences.

In the 1990s, the unique, yet unofficial mascot of mostly all Grobari fan groups was an angry looking bulldog, but in the last few years it has been a sexton standing next to his shovel.

Boycott (2005–2007)

Revolted by Partizan being eliminated from the Champions League qualifications, followed by elimination from the first round of the UEFA cup and from the national cup competition by a third division team, as well as poor results in the domestic league (all at the start of the 2005–06 season), Grobari declared a complete boycott of all Partizan football club matches. Several thousand supporters gathered in September 2005 in front of the club stadium and publicly accused sports director Nenad Bjeković and general secretary Žarko Zečević of tampering with the club's operating budget and transfer policy in order to line their own pockets. On this occasion, they also reminded the public of some previous club officials' machinations.

They demanded club management resignations as a condition for getting back to the stadium stands. Grobari repeated the massive gathering and reiterated their demands in October 2005 in front of the national theatre in downtown Belgrade where Partizan's officials were celebrating the club's 60th anniversary. Both city football derbies between Red Star and Partizan in the 2005–06 season were played without traditional support toward Partizan from the south stands. Although these matches used to gather up tens of thousands and even more fans to the stadiums, the infamous record was established this season when there was only a few thousand spectators on the Partizan stadium, since the rival fans also agreed to boycott the derby (but for other reasons).

After certain changes in the club board, Grobari decided to stop boycotting. On 26 May 2007, they returned to the stadium for a Superliga match against Mladost Apatin which Partizan won 7–1, however they kept on singing insulting songs about Partizan's sports director and general secretary.

By the end of the year both Bjeković and Zečević resigned from their positions.

Ban from Europe
In the 2007–08 UEFA cup, Partizan Belgrade was disqualified from further competition because of football hooliganism against Zrinjski Mostar. Grobari traveled in numbers to Mostar where they fought with the police and also Zrinjski fans. Partizan won the tie 11–1 on aggregate.

2011 Split
In late August 2011, another split among Grobari occurred. A faction of fans calling themselves Zabranjeni (The Forbidden) accused the club board of denying them entrance to the stadium. They are also in disagreement with some other Grobari subgroups, primarily Alcatraz. They attend the games of other teams from Partizan multi-sports club, such as ice hockey or women's basketball teams. In November, a small group were at the match against Borac Čačak. In 2012, they started attending Partizan football games on the east stand.

References

External links 

 juznifront.rs 
 partizan.net 
 volimpartizan.rs 

FK Partizan
Ultras groups
Serbian football supporters' associations